Mufti Mohammad Sayeed  was sworn in as Chief Minister of Jammu and Kashmir on 1 March 2015. The list of ministers:

Cabinet ministers
Mufti Mohammad Sayeed (PDP)-Chief minister
Dr Nirmal Kumar Singh (BJP)-Deputy chief minister
Abdul Rehman Veeri (PDP)
Dr Hasib Drabu (PDP)
Chowdhary Zulfkar Ali (PDP)
Bali Bhagat (BJP)
Basharat Bhukari(PDP)
Ghulam Nabi Lone (PDP)
Choudhary Sukhnandan (BJP)
Chaudhary Lal Singh (BJP)
Altaf Bukhari (PDP)
Chander Prakash Ganga(BJP)
Sajjad Lone
Javed Mustafa Mir (PDP)
Naeem AKhtar (PDP)

Ministers of state
Chandra Prakash(BJP)
Raza Ansari (PDP)
Chering Dorjay {BJP}
Abdul Majid Paddar (PDP)
Sunil Kumar Sharma (BJP)
Mohd Ashraf Mir (PDP)
Abdul Gani Kohli (BJP)
Priya Sethi (BJP)
Pawan Gupta Independent
Ashiya Naqash (PDP)

Also See 

 First Mufti Mohammad Sayeed ministry
 Mehbooba Mufti ministry

References

2015 in Indian politics
Jammu and Kashmir Peoples Democratic Party
Mufti Mohammad Sayeed
Jammu and Kashmir People's Conference
2016 establishments in Jammu and Kashmir
2016 disestablishments in India
Cabinets established in 2015
Cabinets disestablished in 2016